Lyubertsy is a city and the administrative center of Lyuberetsky District in Moscow Oblast, Russia.

Demographics
Population:

History
It was first mentioned in 1621 and was granted town status in 1925. It is sometimes described as a working class suburb of Moscow.

In 1909 International Harvester bought now defunct Uhtomsky factory which before produced railway air brakes and was called "New York" and was repurposed to produce agricultural equipment. It was closed in 2007.

Lyubertsy was home to the Lyubers Soviet sports youth movement in the 1980s. During the perestroika years of the 1990s, the Lyubers, and by association Lyubertsy, formed a part of the emerging organized crime syndicates.

Administrative and municipal status
Within the framework of administrative divisions, Lyubertsy serves as the administrative center of Lyuberetsky District. As an administrative division, it is incorporated within Lyuberetsky District as the Town of Lyubertsy. As a municipal division, the Town of Lyubertsy is incorporated within Lyuberetsky Municipal District as Lyubertsy Urban Settlement.

Economy
Lyubertsy is a major industrial center. There are over twenty-five industrial enterprises and a large railway junction. Prevailing branches of industry are mechanical engineering, metalworking, production of construction materials, woodworking, and food processing.

The largest enterprises include:
Kamov company. Ukhtomsky Helicopter plant named after N. I. Kamov (developer of the Ka-50 "Black Shark" and Ka-52 "Alligator" helicopters)
Ukhtomsky machine-building plant, making equipment for raising livestock
"Torgmash" joint-stock company produces manufacturing equipment
A construction materials plant
"Lyuberetskye carpets" collective
"Belaya dacha" agricultural processing plant, a supplier for McDonald's

People
Sergey Abeltsev, politician
Yuri Gagarin, first human in space
Alexander Menshikov, assistant of Peter the Great
Sergei Lobanov, Russian Second Division football player
Nikolay Rastorguyev, lead singer of rock group Lyube
Boris Razinsky, Olympic champion association football player
Vasily Yakemenko, youth politician

References

Notes

Sources

Cities and towns in Moscow Oblast
Moskovsky Uyezd
17th-century establishments in Russia